Omotik (Sawas) is a moribund Nilotic language of Kenya.  It is spoken by the hunter-gatherer Omotik people of the Great Rift Valley among the Maasai; most of the Omotik population has shifted to the Maasai language.

References

Southern Nilotic languages
Languages of Kenya